The Chiefs (formerly known as the Waikato Chiefs and officially called the Gallagher Chiefs for sponsorship reasons) are a New Zealand professional rugby union team based in Hamilton, Waikato. The team competes in the Super Rugby competition, previously known as the Super 12 and Super 14, and are one of the competition's five New Zealand teams. Their primary home ground is FMG Stadium Waikato.

Until 2004, the Chiefs were the only New Zealand side never to have qualified for the Super 12 semi-finals. In that year the Chiefs earned their first semi-final berth, and in the end achieved fourth place (defeated 37–20 in the semi-final by the ACT Brumbies). They subsequently reached the 2009 final, but found themselves on the short end of a record 61–17 defeat by the Bulls.

The Chiefs were rewarded with a home final after a strong 2012 season. The Chiefs defeated the  37–6, winning their first title. In 2013, the Chiefs became the fourth team to record back-to-back title wins, when they defeated the Brumbies 27–22 at Waikato Stadium.

History
The Chiefs were founded in 1996 as the Waikato Chiefs for the inaugural Super 12 season in 1996. Prior to the Super 12, the Super 10 competition had been in place, which NPC teams took part in, including Waikato. In the first year of competition the Chiefs placed 6th in the overall standings, missing out on making the finals; winning 6 of their 11 regular season matches. The following season the Chiefs placed 11th, winning 4 games and losing 7. In 1998 the Chiefs performed closer to the standard of their 1996 season and placed at 7th in the final standings. In 1999 the side were able to do one better and claimed 6th position on the ladder but were still yet to make the playoffs.

In 2000 the Chiefs won 3 of their regular season games and finished the regular season in 10th place. The following season the team equalled their best position again – finishing 6th. In 2002 the team won 4 games and lost 7 to finish in 8th position, and the season after, 2003 Super 12 season, fell to a 10th-place finish. But the season after, the Chiefs won 7 regular season games and came 4th on the ladder – claiming the first semi-final spot in their history. The Chiefs lost the semi-final against the Brumbies. In 2005 the team finished 6th. In 2006, the Super 12 expanded to the Super 14, with the addition of a new Australian and South African club. The Chiefs won 7 of their 13 games and drew once with 5 losses to come 7th. In 2009, the Chiefs made their second ever semi-final, defeating the  14 – 10 to advance to the final for the first time. They lost the final to the Bulls by the biggest-ever margin of 61–17. In the 2010 and 2011 seasons, they were unable to replicate their form of 2009, missing the playoffs in both seasons.

In 2012, following the disappointing results of previous years, the Chiefs underwent a significant change in personnel. This included the recruitment of new coaches, including Dave Rennie and Wayne Smith, and players, including Aaron Cruden, Ben Tameifuna, Brodie Retallick and Sonny Bill Williams. The changes had an immediate impact as the Chiefs finished at the top of the New Zealand conference, qualifying for a home semi-final, which they won, defeating the  20–17. They also set many club records in the 2012 season, including: most home wins, best home streak, best season winning streak, and most points and tries scored.

In 2013, the Chiefs again won the Super Rugby title and the New Zealand conference with a regular-season record of 12 wins and four losses. They also won the BNZ Cup, a new trophy established by the NZRU for the New Zealand side with the best record in intra-conference matches.

In 2016 the Chiefs played a touring Wales side, winning the one-off encounter 40-7. In doing so they became the first New Zealand Super Rugby franchise to defeat an international team.

In 2017 the Chiefs played the British and Irish Lions side in Hamilton, losing the encounter 34-6. In the regular season, they finished 3rd in the NZ conference and 6th overall, putting them through to the playoffs. They won a thriller quarter final against the Stormers in Cape Town (17-11) but lost in the semi finals to the Crusaders (27-13)

In 2018 the Chiefs finished 3rd in the NZ conference and 5th overall. This result put them through to the quarter finals, in which they lost a tight battle against the Hurricanes (32-31)

The Chiefs didn't have a great start to the 2019 season, losing 4 games straight of the bat, including a loss to the Sunwolves (30-15). However, the Chiefs redeemed themselves by defeating the Bulls 56-20 and going on to win more. They ended up finishing 3rd in the NZ conference and 7th overall, which put them through to the quarter finals. However, the Chiefs would lose to the Jaguares 21-16 in Buenos Aires

After 7 rounds in 2020, the Chiefs were 3rd in the NZ conference and 5th overall. However, the COVID-19 pandemic suspended the 2020 Super Rugby season from going ahead, for travel and health reasons. Despite this, NZRU created a domestic Super Rugby tournament called Super Rugby Aotearoa, which started in June 2020. The Chiefs played well but didn't win a single game in Super Rugby Aotearoa 2020.

The Chiefs lost their first 2 games of Super Rugby Aotearoa in 2021, and then got their first win in the competition against the Hurricanes (35-29) and now the Chiefs are currently on a 5 game win streak, defeating the Blues (15-12), Highlanders (26-23), Crusaders (26-25) and Hurricanes (26-24) and have qualified for the final against the Crusaders.

Franchise area and ownership

Franchise area
Since 1999, the Chiefs have represented the provincial unions of Bay of Plenty, Counties Manukau, King Country, Taranaki, Thames Valley and Waikato.

From 1996 to 1998 the Chiefs also represented North Harbour and Northland, with Counties Manukau and Thames Valley falling under the Auckland Blues catchment. Had the Blues been allowed to represent the Auckland, North Harbour, Counties Manukau and Northland unions, they would have been able to field almost a full national team due to player contracting rules at the time. In an effort by the NZRU to make things more fair, the Chiefs were given North Harbour and Northland, while the Blues were given Counties Manukau and Thames Valley. By 1999, clear regional dominance of national team players no longer existed, so North Harbour and Northland were 'returned' to the Blues in exchange for Counties Manukau and Thames Valley.

Ownership

The Chiefs are a wholly owned subsidiary of the NZRU. However, in an effort to bring more capital into the sport, the NZRU established a system of privatised operation in 2013. In 2014, it was announced that a new entity, 'Chiefs Rugby Club Limited Partnership', had been established, with the NZRU granting the newly formed company a seven-year licence, until the end of the 2020 season, to operate the club. Chiefs Rugby Club itself is 50% owned by the provincial unions within the Chiefs' catchment and 50% by a group of private investors . As part of the Taranaki Rugby Union's investment, the Chiefs will hold two matches per year at Yarrow Stadium in New Plymouth.

Grounds

Development team
The Chiefs have fielded a development team in competitions such as the Pacific Rugby Cup and in matches against other representative teams for several seasons. Known as the Chiefs Development XV, the squad is selected from the best emerging rugby talent in the Chiefs catchment area and is composed of Chiefs contracted players, wider training group members, under 20s, and selected club players.

Records and achievements

Super Rugby placings

Results per opposition
Chiefs Super Rugby results vs different opponents

Honours

Super Rugby (1996–present)

 Champions (2)
2012, 2013
 Runners-up (1)
2009,  2021
 Playoffs Appearances (8)
2004, 2009, 2012, 2013,  2014, 2015, 2016, 2017,
2018, 2019, 2021, 2022

 New Zealand Conference Champions (2)
2012, 2013
 BNZ Cup Winner (2)
2013, 2014

Brisbane Global Tens
 Champions (1)
2017

Current squad

The squad for the 2023 Super Rugby Pacific season is:

Wider training squad
The following players weren't named in the Chiefs 2023 squad, but were named in the Chiefs wider training squad following the full squad announcement.

  Kauvaka Kaivelata (Prop)
  Toby Taylor (Prop)
  Solomone Tukuafu (Prop)
  Taine Kolosi (Hooker)
  Hamilton Burr (Lock)
  Jadin Kingi (Lock)
  Fiti Sa (Lock)
  Jacob Norris (Loose forward)
  Te Rama Reuben (Loose forward)
  Wallace Sititi (Loose forward)
  Connor Collins (Halfback)
  Adam Lennox (Halfback/Fullback)
  Lalomilo Lalomilo (Midfielder)
  Daniel Rona (Midfielder)
  Solomon Alaimalo (Outside back)
  Liam Coombes-Fabling (Outside back)
  Jole Naufahu (Outside back)
  Cody Nordstrom (Outside back)

Current coaches and management

Head coach
 Clayton McMillan

Assistant coaches
 David Hill (assistant coach)
 Neil Barnes (forwards)
 Roger Randle (attack)
 Nick White (scrum)

Performance analysts
 Regan Hall
 Mark Roberts

Former coaches and captains

Coaches

Notes: Official Super Rugby competition matches only, including finals.

Captains

 Richard Turner (1996)
 Ian Jones (1997)
 Errol Brain (1998)
 Michael Collins (1999)
 Glenn Taylor (2000)
 Deon Muir (2001–2002)
 Jono Gibbes (2002–2008)
 Mils Muliaina (2008–2011)
 Liam Messam (2011–2015)
 Craig Clarke (2012–2013)
 Aaron Cruden (2014–2017)
 Brodie Retallick (2014, 2019)
 Sam Cane (2016–present)
 Charlie Ngatai (2018)
 Brad Weber (2021–present)

References

External links
 
 SANZAAR Super Rugby website
 

 
Super Rugby teams
New Zealand rugby union teams
Sport in Waikato
Super Rugby champions